Bald Eagle Lake is a freshwater lake located on the north skirt of Screeching Eagle Peak (elevation point ), a U-shaped ridge massif formed by the junction of Bald Eagle Peak and Silver Eagle Peak, between the West Fork and East Fork of Foss River, in King County, Washington. Other prominent lakes are south of Bald Eagle Lake, including Locket Lake, Otter Lake and Lake Iiswoot, Opal Lake and other Necklace Valley lakes on the eastern slope of Otter Point. Mount Hinman and Mount Daniel are a short distance southeast. Because Bald Eagle Lake is at the heart of the Alpine Lakes Wilderness, the lake is a popular area for hiking, swimming, and fishing.

Access to Bald Eagle Lake is from the Necklace Valley Trailhead on Forest Road 68 which splits off U.S. Route 2.

See also 
 List of lakes of the Alpine Lakes Wilderness

References 

Lakes of King County, Washington
Lakes of the Alpine Lakes Wilderness
Okanogan National Forest